Charles Buell Anderson (January 9, 1927 – May 13, 2008) was the founder of Endeavor Academy, a religious community with its headquarters in Wisconsin, United States.  Prior to founding Endeavor Academy in 1992, Anderson was a real estate salesman.  Anderson also served in the US Marines in the 1940s.

References

1927 births
2008 deaths
Christians from Wisconsin